Mikhail Alexandrovich Antonov (born 4 January 1986) is a Russian former professional cyclist.

Major results

2009
1st Mayor Cup
1st Memorial Oleg Dyachenko
2010
1st Overall Circuit des Ardennes
1st Stage 1
1st Overall Tour du Loir-et-Cher
2011
1st Stage 5 Tour du Loir-et-Cher
2nd Central European Tour Miskolc GP
2012
3rd Overall Vuelta a La Rioja

References

External links

1986 births
Living people
Russian male cyclists
Sportspeople from Izhevsk